Apollonius, son of Charinus, was appointed by Alexander the Great, before leaving Egypt, as governor of the part of Libya on the confines of Egypt in 331 BCE.

Notes

Military personnel of Alexander the Great
4th-century BC rulers
Ancient Cyrenaica
Satraps of the Alexandrian Empire